Ally Mbogo (born 14 November 1994) is a Rwandan football defender who plays for Bugesera.

References

1994 births
Living people
Rwandan footballers
Rwanda international footballers
S.C. Kiyovu Sports players
Bugesera FC players
Association football defenders
2018 African Nations Championship players
Rwanda A' international footballers